was one of the Four Hitokiri of the Bakumatsu, elite samurai, active in Japan during the late Tokugawa shogunate in the 1860s.

Biography
The Hitokiri Shinbei worked under the command of Takechi Hanpeita, the leader of the Kinnō-tō, who sought to overthrow the Tokugawa shogunate and restore the Emperor of Japan to power.

Hanpeita ordered Shinbei and the other hitokiri to enact "Heaven's punishment" (天誅, Tenchū) against supporters of the Shogunate and supporters of foreign access to Japan. A hitokiri from the Satsuma District, Shinbei came from a peasant background. After his first high-level assassination, he was elevated to samurai status despite the traditional samurai disdain towards peasants.

Shinbei was involved in the assassination of Ii Naosuke, the head of the Edo Council of Elders who was the head of administration for the Tokugawa shogunate in 1860. This assassination sparked years of violence in Japan especially in Kyoto where assassinations became commonplace. Of all the Hitokiris, Shinbei killed the most people. Besides Naosuke, his victims included politicians such as Shimada Sakon, Ukyo Omokuni and Homma Seiichiro. He was also suspected of murdering a young woman named Komichi. Because of this, Tanakaba was titled "ansatsu taicho" (captain of assassins). The Shinsengumi was formed in 1863 to suppress the hitokiri and Tosa loyalists and restore law and order.

Shinbei's sword was found at the scene of the assassination of a senior official Anegakōji Kintomo. He was taken for questioning in Kyoto and asked to see the sword. He committed seppuku when he was given the sword.

References

Suicides by seppuku
Samurai
Japanese assassins
1832 births
1863 deaths
1860s suicides